Silver City Bonanza is a 1951 American Western film directed by George Blair and written by Robert Creighton Williams. Starring Rex Allen, Buddy Ebsen, Mary Ellen Kay, Billy Kimbley, Alix Ebsen and Bill Kennedy, it was released on March 1, 1951, by Republic Pictures.

Plot

Cast
Rex Allen as Rex Allen
Buddy Ebsen as Gabe Horne
Mary Ellen Kay as Katie McIntosh
Billy Kimbley as Jimmy McIntosh
Alix Ebsen as Susie McIntosh
Bill Kennedy as Monk Monroe
Gregg Barton as Henchman Hank
Clem Bevans as Town Loafer
Frank Jenks as Theater Owner
Hank Patterson as Postman
Harry Lauter as Pete Horne
Harry Harvey, Sr. as Groggins

References

External links 
 

1951 films
American Western (genre) films
1951 Western (genre) films
Republic Pictures films
Films directed by George Blair
American black-and-white films
1950s English-language films
1950s American films